Stanislav Zhmakin (born June 25, 1982) is a Russian ice hockey winger who current plays for Yugra Khanty-Mansiysk in the Kontinental Hockey League.

Career statistics

Personal life
Zhmakin married Russian singer Daria Vodyahina in June 2010.

References

External links

1982 births
Living people
Avtomobilist Yekaterinburg players
HC CSKA Moscow players
HC Lada Togliatti players
HC Spartak Moscow players
Sportspeople from Penza
Russian ice hockey forwards
Salavat Yulaev Ufa players
Severstal Cherepovets players